Tokyo Vice is an American crime drama television series created by J.T. Rogers and based on the 2009 book of the same title by Jake Adelstein. It premiered on April 7, 2022, on HBO Max. It stars Ansel Elgort and Ken Watanabe in lead roles. In June 2022, the series was renewed for a second season.

Premise
In 1999, American journalist Jake Adelstein has relocated to Tokyo and must pass a written exam in Japanese to have the chance to join the staff of a major Japanese newspaper. He succeeds in becoming their first foreign-born journalist and starts at the very bottom. Taken under the wing of a veteran detective in the vice squad, he starts to explore the dark and dangerous world of the Japanese yakuza whilst living under the city's official line that "murder does not happen in Tokyo".

Cast

Main
 Ansel Elgort as Jake Adelstein, an American journalist from Missouri who moves to Tokyo. The longer he stays, the more he delves into the corruption of Tokyo's seedy underworld, where no one is as they seem.
 Ken Watanabe as Hiroto Katagiri, a detective in the organized crime division. He's a father figure to Adelstein who helps guide him through the thin and often precarious line between the law and organized crime.
 Rachel Keller as Samantha Porter, an American expatriate living in Tokyo and former Mormon who makes her living as a hostess in the Onyx Club of the Kabukicho district. Her clients vary from salarymen to high-end clients and yakuza.
 Hideaki Itō as Jin Miyamoto, a vice squad  detective who is Jake's first contact in the police department but who is secretly working with the yakuza.
 Shō Kasamatsu as Sato, an enforcer in the Chihara-kai yakuza clan who collects protection money and is Samantha's handler at the Onyx Club. He secretly has a crush on her and is disillusioned by the yakuza lifestyle which he sees as anachronistic.
 Rinko Kikuchi as Emi Maruyama, Adelstein's supervisor, a composite of the various colleagues and supervisors who worked with the real life Adelstein during his career.
 Ella Rumpf as Polina, an Eastern European migrant, and a struggling new hostess at the Onyx Club with Samantha. A kind-hearted but naive woman, she came to Tokyo to work as a model but was pulled into the seedy underbelly of Kabukicho.

Supporting
 Kōsuke Toyohara as Baku, Jake's by-the-books, racist nationalist boss.
 Takaki Uda as "Trendy" Kurihira, Jake's handsome friend and coworker.
 Kosuke Tanaka as "Tintin" Shinohara, Jake's witty friend and coworker.  
 Masato Hagiwara as Duke, the owner of the Onyx hostess club.
 Shun Sugata as Hitoshi Ishida, the leader of the Chihara-kai yakuza clan which includes Sato.
 Eugene Nomura as Kobayashi, Ishida's right-hand man.
 Koshi Uehara as Taro, a member of Ishida's organization.
 Masayoshi Haneda as Yoshihiro Kume, Sato's direct superior within the organization who is later revealed to be a Tozawa mole.
 Noémie Nakai as Luna, the most prestigious hostess at the Onyx club.
 Ayumi Tanida as Shinzo Tozawa, leader of a rival yakuza organization who is trying to establish himself in Tokyo even though he has an unnamed incurable health condition.
 Kazuya Tanabe as Yabuki, a senior member of Tozawa's organization.
 Jundai Yamada as Matsuo, a cultured man who becomes one of Samantha's clients and then reveals that he was hired to track her down.
 Tomohisa Yamashita as Akira, Polina's boyfriend who works at a Host Club.
 Yuka Itaya as Mrs. Katagiri, Hiroto's wife.
 Sarah Sawyer as Jessica Adelstein, Jake's sister who sends him audio letters on tapes and has been in mental health treatment.
 Jessica Hecht as Willa Adelstein, Jake's mother.
 Fumiya Kimura as Koji, Sato's first recruit within Ishida's organization.
 Nanami Kawakami as Yuka, a young woman Jake hooks up with while hanging out with Sato, later revealed to be a prostitute.
 Ayumi Ito as Misaki, Tozawa's bed partner.
 Hiroshi Sogabe as Sugita, head of the Suzuno insurance company, which manipulates people into debt with Tozawa's organization.
 Motoki Kobayashi as Ukai Haruki, a writer and meth user and publishes articles about Tozawa, with his approval.

Episodes

Production

Development
Tokyo Vice was initially set up as a movie in 2013, with Daniel Radcliffe attached to star as Adelstein. Anthony Mandler was set to direct, and development was advanced enough to where a production start of mid-2014 was set. In June 2019, the project was repurposed as a television series, receiving an eight-episode order from WarnerMedia to be streamed on its streaming service HBO Max. Ansel Elgort was to be executive producer on the series, with J. T. Rogers writing and Destin Daniel Cretton directing.  In October 2019, Michael Mann was hired to direct the pilot episode and also serve as an executive producer of the series. The series premiered on April 7, 2022, with the first three episodes available immediately, followed by two episodes on a weekly basis until the season finale on April 28, 2022. On June 7, 2022, HBO Max renewed the series for a second season.

Casting
In addition to his executive producing announcement, Ansel Elgort was also set to star. In September 2019, Ken Watanabe was added to the cast. In February 2020, Odessa Young and Ella Rumpf were added to the cast. In March 2020, it was announced that Rinko Kikuchi joined the cast, and that shooting began the previous month in Tokyo. In October 2020, Rachel Keller was cast to replace Young. In September 2021, Hideaki Itō, Shō Kasamatsu and Tomohisa Yamashita were announced as series regulars, with Shun Sugata, Masato Hagiwara, Ayumi Tanida and Kōsuke Toyohara joining as recurring.<ref>{{cite web |last1=Grater |first1=Tom |title=HBO Max's 'Tokyo Vice Adds Hideaki Ito, Show Kasamatsu & Tomohisa Yamashita As Series Regulars |url=https://deadline.com/2021/09/hbo-maxs-tokyo-vice-hideaki-ito-show-kasamatsu-tomohisa-yamashita-series-regulars-1234833897/ |website=Deadline Hollywood |access-date=16 September 2021 |date=September 15, 2021}}</ref> In November 2022 Aoi Takeya and Takayuki Suzuki were announced to be cast.

Filming
Principal photography on the series began on March 5, 2020. On March 17, 2020, it was announced that production had halted due to the COVID-19 pandemic in Tokyo. Production resumed on November 26, 2020, and concluded on June 8, 2021. Production for the second season started in November 2022 in Tokyo.

Release
HBO Max and its sibling service HBO Go hold streaming rights to the series in countries where either service is available including the United States, Latin America, and certain European and Asian markets, while Wowow, also a co-producer, holds rights in Japan. Elsewhere, international distributor Endeavor Content has sold broadcast/streaming rights to the series to Crave in Canada, Canal+ in France, Paramount+ in Australia, OSN+ in the Middle East and Northern Africa region, and Starzplay in select European markets including the UK and Ireland. The BBC purchased second-window rights to the series in the UK, and began to air it in November 2022 on BBC One,TV tonight: the gritty underworld of 90s Japan in Tokyo Vice, The Guardian, 22 November 2022 with all episodes available for six months on the BBC's iPlayer service.

Reception
The review aggregator website Rotten Tomatoes reported an 85% approval rating with an average rating of 7.6/10, based on 60 critic reviews. The website's critics consensus reads, "Tokyo Vice''s protagonist is its least interesting element, but the intrigue of Japan's underworld and the verisimilitude of its setting make for a seductive slice of neo-noir." Metacritic, which uses a weighted average, assigned a score of 75 out of 100 based on 27 critics, indicating "generally favorable reviews".

References

External links
 

2022 American television series debuts
2020s American crime drama television series
English-language television shows
HBO Max original programming
Japanese-language television shows
Television productions suspended due to the COVID-19 pandemic
Television series about journalism
Television series set in 1999
Television shows based on non-fiction books
Television shows filmed in Japan
Television shows set in Tokyo
Works about the Yakuza